Marijn van Heugten (born 6 June 1997) is a Dutch former football player.

Club career
He made his professional debut in the Eerste Divisie for Helmond Sport on 8 April 2016 in a game against Sparta Rotterdam.

References

External links
 

1997 births
People from Deurne, Netherlands
Living people
Dutch footballers
Helmond Sport players
Eerste Divisie players
Association football forwards
Footballers from North Brabant